Friends In Danger is the debut studio album by Australian rock band, Magic Dirt. It was released in September 1996 and peaked at number 25 on the ARIA Charts.

Reception

Australian rock music historian Ian McFarlane said "[it] matched the band's fearless experimentation with a dark, unhinged sound that went from moments of eerie near-silence to full-tilt guitar noise"

The album was described by Mushroom Music as "A dark, brooding and heavy as all hell slab of sludge/slacker rock."

Track listing
All songs written by Magic Dirt.

 "Friends in Danger" - 4:45
 "Heavy Business" - 2:13
 "Pristine Christine" - 4:42
 "Bodysnatcher" - 8:20
 "Dylan's Lullaby" - 2:30
 "Sparrow" - 3:23
 "Shovel" - 4:22
 "Fear" - 3:29
 "Befriended Fallen Angel" - 5:08
 "I Was Cruel" - 6:55

Charts

Release history

References

1996 debut albums
Magic Dirt albums
Au Go Go Records albums
Warner Records albums